Djery Jean Baptiste  ; born 12 November 1995) is a Haitian basketball player. He played college basketball for the Vanderbilt Commodores and the UMass Minutemen.

Early life and high school career
Baptiste was born in Gonaïves, Haiti to Hebert Jean Baptiste and Wislonde Destin. He arrived in the United States when he was 15 years old.

Baptiste attended the Prestonwood Christian Academy in Plano, Texas and won two consecutive state championships the two years he was there. At the end of his senior year, he was named Defensive Player of the Year by his team. He was named All-Area Honorable Mention by the Dallas Morning News.

College career
Baptiste chose to play at Vanderbilt for academic reasons, despite receiving multiple offers from other schools.

Baptiste departed from the team in June 2018 to focus on his studies.

In August 2018, it was announced that Baptiste will be transferring to UMass after he graduates from Vanderbilt in December 2018. During his redshirt senior season, he missed three games with a knee injury.

Career statistics

College

|-
| style="text-align:left;"| 2015–16
| style="text-align:left;"| Vanderbilt
| style="text-align:center;" colspan="11"|  Redshirt
|-
| style="text-align:left;"| 2016–17
| style="text-align:left;"| Vanderbilt
| 35 || 2 || 7.8 || .521 || – || .650 || 1.9 || .0 || .1 || .4 || 1.8
|-
| style="text-align:left;"| 2017–18
| style="text-align:left;"| Vanderbilt
| 29 || 10 || 15.2 || .455 || – || .732 || 3.6 || .2 || .2 || .9 || 3.1
|-
| style="text-align:left;"| 2018–19
| style="text-align:left;"| UMass
| 20 || 12 || 17.9 || .511 || – || .455 || 4.1 || .3 || .3 || 1.2 || 2.9
|-
| style="text-align:left;"| 2019–20
| style="text-align:left;"| UMass
| 27 || 0 || 10.6 || .510 || – || .389 || 2.6 || .1 || .4 || .9 || 2.1
|- class="sortbottom"
| style="text-align:center;" colspan="2"| Career
| 111 || 24 || 12.2 || .495 || – || .594 || 2.9 || .1 || .2 || .8 || 2.4

Personal life
Baptiste arrived from Haiti speaking no English. He taught himself English from music listening to country singer George Strait's songs and is now his favorite genre. He speaks French, Haitian Creole, and Spanish fluently.

References

External links
UMass Minutemen bio
Vanderbilt Commodores bio

1995 births
Living people
Basketball players from Texas
Centers (basketball)
Haitian expatriate basketball people in the United States
Haitian men's basketball players
People from Gonaïves
Sportspeople from Plano, Texas
Vanderbilt Commodores men's basketball players
UMass Minutemen basketball players